Michael Rory Zaher (born September 24, 1985 in Phoenix, Arizona) is a former American soccer player.

Career

College and amateur
Zaher attended Bishop Gorman High School in Las Vegas, Nevada, whom he led to the Nevada high school state championship in 2002; he scored 34 goals as a senior, 25 as a junior, 13 as a sophomore and six as a freshman for a total of 78 career goals. He also led his club soccer team, Las Vegas Premier, to seven Nevada state championships.

Zaher played college soccer at UCLA, where he majored in political science. He played in 70 games over four seasons, scoring twice in the run-up to the 2006 NCAA soccer championship game in St. Louis, which UCLA lost 2–1 to UC Santa Barbara. Zaher is a former member of the U.S. U-18 National Team, was listed at #21 in Soccer America's Top 25 recruits list, is a two-time Parade All-American, was a member of the 2004 McDonald’s All-American team and the 2003 NSCAA/adidas All-American team, was the Gatorade State Player of the Year in 2004, and was selected to the ESP All-Star Team in 2002 and 2003.

During his college years, Zaher also played in the USL Premier Development League, for Boulder Rapids Reserve and the San Fernando Valley Quakes.

Professional
Zaher was drafted in the 3rd round of the 2008 MLS Superdraft by Canadian Major League Soccer side Toronto FC. However, his rights were traded to D.C. United for an undisclosed pick, and he was officially signed to the development roster on 17 April 2008. He made his professional debut for DC on 19 July 2008, coming on as a second-half substitute for Bryan Namoff in a SuperLiga game against Houston Dynamo, and made his first MLS appearance came on August 20, 2008, starting against New England Revolution.

On March 16, 2009, Zaher signed a developmental contract with the San Jose Earthquakes.

Zaher featured in 10 MLS games for San Jose before being released at the end of the 2009 season; he signed terms with USL Second Division side Charleston Battery on March 23, 2010.

After two years with Charleston, Zaher signed with USL side Rochester Rhinos on November 28, 2011.

Personal
Zaher has also dabbled in acting, featuring as the leading man in JoJo's music video for her 2006 single "Too Little Too Late".

Honors

D.C. United
Lamar Hunt U.S. Open Cup: 2008

Charleston Battery
 USL Second Division Champions: 2010
 USL Second Division Regular Season Champions: 2010

References

External links
 Charleston Battery bio
 MLS player profile
 UCLA bio
 Daily Bruin (UCLA newspaper) profile
 Evenison interview
 Far West selection

1985 births
Living people
American soccer players
Colorado Rapids U-23 players
San Fernando Valley Quakes players
D.C. United players
San Jose Earthquakes players
Charleston Battery players
Rochester New York FC players
Parade High School All-Americans (boys' soccer)
UCLA Bruins men's soccer players
USL League Two players
Major League Soccer players
USL Second Division players
USL Championship players
Toronto FC draft picks
Bishop Gorman High School alumni
Soccer players from Nevada
Sportspeople from Las Vegas
Association football defenders